Owain is a name of Welsh origin, variously written in Old Welsh as Ougein, Eugein, Euguen, Iguein, Ou(u)ein, Eug(u)ein, Yuein, and in Middle Welsh as Ewein, Owein, and Ywein. Other variants of the name Owain include Ewein, Iguein, Owein, Ouein, Ywen, Ywein, Ywain, Yuein, and Yvain. Owain has also been Latinized as Oenus.

Etymology
Osborn Bergin proposed that the name is cognate with Old Irish Ugaine, Augaine, and suggested that the Irish name could be a British loan. Linguist Kenneth H. Jackson proposed that the name is a derivation of the Latin Eugenius, (which was more recently accepted by T.J. Morgan). Julius Pokorny favored a purely Celtic origin, from Brittonic *Ouo-genios/*Owi-genjos, "Born of Sheep", "Sheep kin". Linguists Holger Pedersen and Henry Lewis (who earlier linked the name to Gaulish *Esugenos) determined that both Jackson's and Pokorny's etymologies were phonologically impossible.

Popularity
Owain is one of the few Welsh names to be consistently popular over the last 100 years in England and Wales, particularly with the spelling Owen (and pronunciation //). Patronymics include Bowen (from [a]b Owain) and Owens.

People

Pre-modern era
Ordered chronologically.
 Owain Danwyn (Prince of North Wales, proposed as possible candidate for the "real" King Arthur
 Owain mab Urien (died c. 595), son of Urien, King of Rheged. He is remembered as Sir Ywain in Arthurian legend.
 Owain ap Hywel (Glywysing) (died c. 930), King of Glywysing and Gwent
 Owain ap Dyfnwal (fl. 934), King of the Cumbrians
 Owain ap Hywel Dda (died c. 988), King of Deheubarth in south Wales and probably also controlled Powys
 Owain ap Dyfnwal (died 1015), King of the Cumbrians
 Owain Foel, King of the Cumbrians
 Owain Gwynedd (c. 1100–1170), aka Owain ap Gruffydd, King of Gwynedd
 Owain Fychan (c. 1125–1187), ruler of part of Powys
 Owain Cyfeiliog (c. 1130–1197), prince of part of Powys and poet
 Owain Goch ap Gruffydd (in English, "Owain the Red") (died c. 1280), ruler of part of the Kingdom of Gwynedd
 Owen de la Pole, also known as Owain ap Gruffydd ap Gwenwynwyn (c. 1257–c. 1293), lord of Powys
 Owain ap Dafydd (c. 1275–c. 1325), potential claimant to the title Prince of Gwynedd
 Owain Lawgoch (in English "Owain of the Red Hand", also known as Owain ap Thomas ap Rhodri) (c. 1330–1378), a claimant to the throne of Wales
 Owain Glyndŵr, sometimes anglicised as Owen Glendower (1359–c. 1416), last Welshman to hold the title Prince of Wales
 Owen Tudor (in Welsh, Owain ap Maredudd ap Tudur) (c. 1400–1461), Welsh courtier, the second husband of Catherine of Valois (1401–1437), widow of King Henry V of England, and grandfather of King Henry VII of England

Modern era
Ordered alphabetically.
 Owain Arthur (born 1983), Welsh actor
 Owain Wyn Evans (born 1984), Welsh journalist, broadcaster and television presenter
 Owain Hopkins (born 1980), Welsh cricketer
 Owain Jones (disambiguation)
 Owain Owain (1929–1993), Welsh novelist, short-story writer and poet, one of the founders of the Welsh Language Society
 Owain Williams (disambiguation)
 Owain Yeoman (born 1978), Welsh actor
 Owain Gwyn Griffiths (born 1964), Welsh Actor

Fictional characters
 Owain, in the role-playing video game Fire Emblem Awakening

See also
 Owen (name) (anglicised form of the name)

References

Welsh masculine given names